C. aurantiaca may refer to:

 Caladenia aurantiaca, an orchidoid orchid
 Callosamia aurantiaca, an American moth
 Caloplaca aurantiaca, a lichen found in the United States
 Caloptilia aurantiaca, a leaf miner
 Canna aurantiaca, a garden plant
 Caragana aurantiaca, a flowering plant
 Catocala aurantiaca, an owlet moth
 Cattleya aurantiaca, an epiphytic orchid
 Chrysomphalina aurantiaca, a gilled mushroom
 Coccinia aurantiaca, a scarlet gourd
 Coenyra aurantiaca, a brush-footed butterfly
 Cronia aurantiaca, a sea snail
 Curcuma aurantiaca, a flowering plant